Jumpei Arai may refer to:
 Jumpei Arai (footballer, born 1989) (新井 純平), Japanese retired football midfielder
 Jumpei Arai (footballer, born 1994) (新井 純平), Japanese football defender for Yokohama FC